The 2022–23 Sacyr Liga ASOBAL, also named Liga ASOBAL for sponsorship reasons, is the 33nd season since its establishment. Spanish top tier handball league. A total of sixteen teams conteste this season's league, which begin on 3 September 2022 and is expected to end on 3 June 2023.

Promotion and relegation 
Teams relegated to 2022–23 División de Plata
 Club Balonmano Nava
 BM Antequera

Teams promoted from 2021–22 División de Plata
 AD Ciudad de Guadalajara
 BM Cisne

2022-23 season teams

League table

Results

External links
Official website

Liga ASOBAL seasons
Handball in Spain